Preobrazhenskoye was a village (selo) in Aleutsky District of Kamchatka Oblast, Russian SFSR, Soviet Union, located on Medny Island in the Commander Islands group east of the Kamchatka Peninsula.

The village was founded in the 19th century by Aleut (Unangan) settlers from Attu Island in the Aleutian Islands. They were engaged in whaling and sealing with harpoons and spears.  Fishing and hunting of whales and other
marine mammals were the mainstay of the economy there.

The village was abolished in the 1960s due to low population.

See also
Nikolskoye, Kamchatka Krai, a larger village on Bering Island

References

Geography of Kamchatka Krai
Commander Islands
Former populated places in Russia